In mathematics, the Cantor set is a set of points lying on a single line segment that has a number of unintuitive properties.  It was discovered in 1874 by Henry John Stephen Smith and introduced by German mathematician Georg Cantor in 1883.

Through consideration of this set, Cantor and others helped lay the foundations of modern point-set topology. The most common construction is the Cantor ternary set, built by removing the middle third of a line segment and then repeating the process with the remaining shorter segments. Cantor mentioned the ternary construction only in passing, as an example of a more general idea, that of a perfect set that is nowhere dense.

More generally, in topology, a Cantor space is a topological space homeomorphic to the Cantor ternary set (equipped with its subspace topology). By a theorem of Brouwer, this is equivalent to being perfect nonempty, compact metrizable and zero dimensional.

Construction and formula of the ternary set
The Cantor ternary set  is created by iteratively deleting the open middle third from a set of line segments. One starts by deleting the open middle third  from the interval , leaving two line segments: .  Next, the open middle third of each of these remaining segments is deleted, leaving four line segments: .
The Cantor ternary set contains all points in the interval  that are not deleted at any step in this infinite process. The same facts can be described recursively by setting
 
and
 
      for any   .

The first six steps of this process are illustrated below.

Using the idea of self-similar transformations,   and  the explicit closed formulas for the Cantor set are
 
where every middle third is removed as the open interval  from the closed interval  surrounding it, or
 
where the middle third  of the foregoing closed interval  is removed by intersecting with 

This process of removing middle thirds is a simple example of a finite subdivision rule.  The complement of the Cantor ternary set is an example of a fractal string.

In arithmetical terms, the Cantor set consists of all real numbers of the unit interval  that do not require the digit 1 in order to be expressed as a ternary (base 3) fraction. As the above diagram illustrates, each point in the Cantor set is uniquely located by a path through an infinitely deep binary tree, where the path turns left or right at each level according to which side of a deleted segment the point lies on. Representing each left turn with 0 and each right turn with 2 yields the ternary fraction for a point.

Mandelbrot's Construction by "Curdling" 
His narrative begins with imagining a bar, perhaps of lightweight metal, in which the bar's matter "curdles" by iteratively shifting towards its extremities. As the bar's segments become smaller, they become thin, dense slugs that eventually grow too small and faint to see.CURDLING: The construction of the Cantor bar results from the process I call curdling. It begins with a round bar. It is best to think of it as having a very low density. Then matter “curdles” out of this bar’s middle third into the end thirds, so that the positions of the latter remain unchanged. Next matter curdles out of the middle third of each end third into its end thirds, and so on ad infinitum until one is left with an infinitely large number of infinitely thin slugs of infinitely high density. These slugs are spaced along the line in the very specific fashion induced by the generating process. In this illustration, curdling (which eventually requires hammering!) stops when both the printer’s press and our eye cease to follow; the last line is indistinguishable from the last but one: each of its ultimate parts is seen as a gray slug rather than two parallel black slugs.”

Composition 
Since the Cantor set is defined as the set of points not excluded, the proportion (i.e., measure) of the unit interval remaining can be found by total length removed.  This total is the geometric progression

So that the proportion left is  1 − 1 = 0.

This calculation suggests that the Cantor set cannot contain any interval of non-zero length. It may seem surprising that there should be anything left—after all, the sum of the lengths of the removed intervals is equal to the length of the original interval. However, a closer look at the process reveals that there must be something left, since removing the "middle third" of each interval involved removing open sets (sets that do not include their endpoints). Subsequent steps do not remove these (or other) endpoints, since the intervals removed are always internal to the intervals remaining. So the Cantor set is not empty, and in fact contains an uncountably infinite number of points (as follows from the above description in terms of paths in an infinite binary tree).

It may appear that only the endpoints of the construction segments are left, but that is not the case either. The number , for example, has the unique ternary form 0.020202... = . It is in the bottom third, and the top third of that third, and the bottom third of that top third, and so on. Since it is never in one of the middle segments, it is never removed. Yet it is also not an endpoint of any middle segment, because it is not a multiple of any power of 1/3.
All endpoints of segments are terminating ternary fractions and are contained in the set

which is a countably infinite set.
As to cardinality, almost all elements of the Cantor set are not endpoints of intervals, nor rational points like 1/4.  The whole Cantor set is in fact not countable.

Properties

Cardinality 
It can be shown that there are as many points left behind in this process as there were to begin with, and that therefore, the Cantor set is uncountable. Since  is a subset of [0,1], its cardinality is also no greater, so the two cardinalities must in fact be equal, by the Cantor–Bernstein–Schröder theorem.

To construct this function, consider the points in the [0, 1] interval in terms of base 3 (or ternary) notation.
When we remove the middle third, this contains the numbers with ternary numerals of the form 0.1xxxxx...3 where xxxxx...3 is strictly between 00000...3 and 22222...3. So the numbers remaining after the first step consist of
 Numbers of the form 0.0xxxxx...3 (including 0.022222...3 = 1/3)
 Numbers of the form 0.2xxxxx...3 (including 0.222222...3 = 1)

This can be summarized by saying that those numbers with a ternary representation such that the first digit after the radix point is not 1 are the ones remaining after the first step.

The second step removes numbers of the form 0.01xxxx...3 and 0.21xxxx...3, and (with appropriate care for the endpoints) it can be concluded that the remaining numbers are those with a ternary numeral where neither of the first two digits is 1.

Continuing in this way, for a number not to be excluded at step n, it must have a ternary representation whose nth digit is not 1.  For a number to be in the Cantor set, it must not be excluded at any step, it must admit a numeral representation consisting entirely of 0s and 2s.

It is worth emphasizing that numbers like 1,  = 0.13 and  = 0.213 are in the Cantor set, as they have ternary numerals consisting entirely of 0s and 2s: 1 = 0.222...3 = 3,  = 0.0222...3 = 3 and  = 0.20222...3 = 3.
All these endpoints are proper ternary fractions (elements of ) of the form , where denominator q is a power of 3 when the fraction is in its irreducible form. The ternary representation of these fractions terminates (i.e., is finite) or — recall from above that proper ternary fractions each have 2 representations — is infinite and “ends” in either infinitely many recurring 0s or infinitely many recurring 2s. Such a fraction is a left limit point of  if its ternary representation contains no 1's and “ends” in infinitely many recurring 0s. Similarly, a proper ternary fraction is a right limit point of  if it again its ternary expansion contains no 1's and “ends” in infinitely many recurring 2s.

In a formula,

   where   

With this, f(x) = y so that y is in the range of f. For instance if y =  = 0.100110011001...2 = , we write x =  = 0.200220022002...3 = . Consequently, f is surjective. However, f is not injective — the values for which f(x) coincides are those at opposing ends of one of the middle thirds removed. For instance, take
so

Thus there are as many points in the Cantor set as there are in the interval [0, 1] (which has the uncountable cardinality  However, the set of endpoints of the removed intervals is countable, so there must be uncountably many numbers in the Cantor set which are not interval endpoints. In fact, given any , there exist  such that . This was first demonstrated by Steinhaus in 1917, who proved, via a geometric argument, the equivalent assertion that  for every . Assuming that  for any infinite set  (a statement shown to be equivalent to the axiom of choice by Tarski), this provides another demonstration that .

The Cantor set contains as many points as the interval from which it is taken, yet itself contains no interval of nonzero length. The irrational numbers have the same property, but the Cantor set has the additional property of being closed, so it is not even dense in any interval, unlike the irrational numbers which are dense in every interval.

It has been conjectured that all algebraic irrational numbers are normal.  Since members of the Cantor set are not normal, this would imply that all members of the Cantor set are either rational or transcendental.

Self-similarity 
The Cantor set is the prototype of a fractal. It is self-similar, because it is equal to two copies of itself, if each copy is shrunk by a factor of 3 and translated.

That is, at each node of the tree, one may consider the subtree to the left or to the right. Taking the set  together with function composition forms a monoid, the dyadic monoid.

The automorphisms of the binary tree are its hyperbolic rotations, and are given by the modular group. An explicit construction of  can be described more easily if we see the Cantor set as a product space of  countably many copies of the discrete space .

Conservation law

It has been found that some form of conservation law is always responsible behind scaling and self-similarity. In the case of Cantor set it can be seen that the th moment (where  is the fractal dimension) of all the surviving intervals at any stage of the construction process is equal to constant which is equal to one in the case of Cantor set.
We know that there are  intervals of size  present in the system at the th step of its construction. Then if we label the surviving intervals as  then the th moment is  since .

The Hausdorff dimension of the Cantor set is equal to ln(2)/ln(3) ≈ 0.631.

Topological and analytical properties 

Although "the" Cantor set typically refers to the original, middle-thirds Cantor set described above, topologists often talk about "a" Cantor set, which means any topological space that is homeomorphic (topologically equivalent) to it.

As the above summation argument shows, the Cantor set is uncountable but has Lebesgue measure 0. Since the Cantor set is the complement of a union of open sets, it itself is a closed subset of the reals, and therefore a complete metric space. Since it is also totally bounded, the Heine–Borel theorem says that it must be compact.

For any point in the Cantor set and any arbitrarily small neighborhood of the point, there is some other number with a ternary numeral of only 0s and 2s, as well as numbers whose ternary numerals contain 1s.  Hence, every point in the Cantor set is an accumulation point (also called a cluster point or limit point) of the Cantor set, but none is an interior point. A closed set in which every point is an accumulation point is also called a perfect set in topology, while a closed subset of the interval with no interior points is nowhere dense in the interval.

Every point of the Cantor set is also an accumulation point of the complement of the Cantor set.

For any two points in the Cantor set, there will be some ternary digit where they differ — one will have 0 and the other 2.  By splitting the Cantor set into "halves" depending on the value of this digit, one obtains a partition of the Cantor set into two closed sets that separate the original two points.  In the relative topology on the Cantor set, the points have been separated by a clopen set.  Consequently, the Cantor set is totally disconnected.  As a compact totally disconnected Hausdorff space, the Cantor set is an example of a Stone space.

As a topological space, the Cantor set is naturally homeomorphic to the product of countably many copies of the space , where each copy carries the discrete topology. This is the space of all sequences in two digits 

which can also be identified with the set of 2-adic integers. The basis for the open sets of the product topology are cylinder sets; the homeomorphism maps these to the subspace topology that the Cantor set inherits from the natural topology on the real line. This characterization of the Cantor space as a product of compact spaces gives a second proof that Cantor space is compact, via Tychonoff's theorem.

From the above characterization, the Cantor set is homeomorphic to the p-adic integers, and, if one point is removed from it, to the p-adic numbers.

The Cantor set is a subset of the reals, which are a metric space with respect to the ordinary distance metric; therefore the Cantor set itself is a metric space, by using that same metric. These two metrics generate the same topology on the Cantor set.

We have seen above that the Cantor set is a totally disconnected perfect compact metric space. Indeed, in a sense it is the only one: every nonempty totally disconnected perfect compact metric space is homeomorphic to the Cantor set. See Cantor space for more on spaces homeomorphic to the Cantor set.

The Cantor set is sometimes regarded as "universal" in the category of compact metric spaces, since any compact metric space is a continuous image of the Cantor set; however this construction is not unique and so the Cantor set is not universal in the precise categorical sense. The "universal" property has important applications in functional analysis, where it is sometimes known as the representation theorem for compact metric spaces.

For any integer q ≥ 2, the topology on the group G = Zqω (the countable direct sum) is discrete. Although the Pontrjagin dual Γ is also Zqω, the topology of Γ is compact. One can see that Γ is totally disconnected and perfect - thus it is homeomorphic to the Cantor set. It is easiest to write out the homeomorphism explicitly in the case q = 2. (See Rudin 1962 p 40.)

The geometric mean of the Cantor set is approximately 0.274974.

Measure and probability
The Cantor set can be seen as the compact group of binary sequences, and as such, it is endowed with a natural Haar measure. When normalized so that the measure of the set is 1, it is a model of an infinite sequence of coin tosses. Furthermore, one can show that the usual Lebesgue measure on the interval is an image of the Haar measure on the Cantor set, while the natural injection into the ternary set is a canonical example of a singular measure. It can also be shown that the Haar measure is an image of any probability, making the Cantor set a universal probability space in some ways.

In Lebesgue measure theory, the Cantor set is an example of a set which is uncountable and has zero measure. In contrast, the set has a Hausdorff measure of 1 in its dimension of log 2 / log 3.

Cantor numbers
If we define a Cantor number as a member of the Cantor set, then
 Every real number in [0, 2] is the sum of two Cantor numbers.
 Between any two Cantor numbers there is a number that is not a Cantor number.

Descriptive set theory 
The Cantor set is a meagre set (or a set of first category) as a subset of [0,1] (although not as a subset of itself, since it is a Baire space). The Cantor set thus demonstrates that notions of "size" in terms of cardinality, measure, and (Baire) category need not coincide. Like the set , the Cantor set  is "small" in the sense that it is a null set (a set of measure zero) and it is a meagre subset of [0,1]. In fact, it is also possible to construct a subset of [0,1] that is meagre but of positive measure and a subset that is non-meagre but of measure zero:  By taking the countable union of "fat" Cantor sets  of measure  (see Smith–Volterra–Cantor set below for the construction), we obtain a set which has a positive measure (equal to 1) but is meagre in [0,1], since each  is nowhere dense. Then consider the set . Since ,  cannot be meagre, but since ,  must have measure zero.

Variants

Smith–Volterra–Cantor set

Instead of repeatedly removing the middle third of every piece as in the Cantor set, we could also keep removing any other fixed percentage (other than 0% and 100%) from the middle. In the case where the middle  of the interval is removed, we get a remarkably accessible case — the set consists of all numbers in [0,1] that can be written as a decimal consisting entirely of 0s and 9s.

On the other hand, "fat Cantor sets" of positive measure can be generated by removal of smaller fractions of the middle of the segment in each iteration. Thus, one can construct sets homeomorphic to the Cantor set that have positive Lebesgue measure while still being nowhere dense.

Stochastic Cantor set

One can modify the construction of the Cantor set by dividing randomly instead of equally. Besides, to incorporate time we can divide only one of the available intervals at each step instead of dividing all the available intervals. In the case of stochastic triadic Cantor set the resulting process can be described by the following rate equation

and for the stochastic dyadic Cantor set

less than its deterministic counterpart . In the case of stochastic dyadic Cantor set
In the case of stochastic dyadic Cantor set the solution for  exhibits dynamic scaling as its solution in the long-time limit is  where the fractal dimension of the stochastic dyadic Cantor set . In either case, like triadic Cantor set, the th moment of stochastic triadic and dyadic Cantor set too are conserved quantities.

Cantor dust 

Cantor dust is a multi-dimensional version of the Cantor set. It can be formed by taking a finite Cartesian product of the Cantor set with itself, making it a Cantor space. Like the Cantor set, Cantor dust has zero measure.

A different 2D analogue of the Cantor set is the Sierpinski carpet, where a square is divided up into nine smaller squares, and the middle one removed. The remaining squares are then further divided into nine each and the middle removed, and so on ad infinitum. One 3D analogue of this is the Menger sponge.

Historical remarks

Cantor introduced what we call today the Cantor ternary set  as an example "of a perfect point-set, which is not everywhere-dense in any interval, however small."  Cantor described  in terms of ternary expansions, as "the set of all real numbers given by the formula: where the coefficients  arbitrarily take the two values 0 and 2, and the series can consist of a finite number or an infinite number of elements."

A topological space  is perfect if all its points are limit points or, equivalently, if it coincides with its derived set . Subsets of the real line, like , can be seen as topological spaces under the induced subspace topology.

Cantor was led to the study of derived sets by his results on uniqueness of trigonometric series. The latter did much to set him on the course for developing an abstract, general theory of infinite sets.

Benoit Mandelbrot wrote much on Cantor dusts and their relation to natural fractals and statistical physics. He further reflected on the puzzling or even upsetting nature of such structures to those in the mathematics and physics community. In The Fractal geometry of Nature, he described how "When I started on this topic in 1962, everyone was agreeing that Cantor dusts are at least as monstrous as the Koch and Peano curves," and added that "every self-respecting physicist was automatically turned off by a mention of Cantor, ready to run a mile from anyone claiming  to be interesting in science."

See also 
The indicator function of the Cantor set
Smith–Volterra–Cantor set
Cantor function
Cantor cube
Antoine's necklace
Koch snowflake
Knaster–Kuratowski fan
List of fractals by Hausdorff dimension
Moser–de Bruijn sequence

Notes

References

 
 
 
 
 .

External links
 
 Cantor Sets and Cantor Set and Function at cut-the-knot
 Cantor Set at Platonic Realms

Measure theory
Topological spaces
Sets of real numbers
Georg Cantor
L-systems